Anecdata.org  (often shortened to Anecdata) is a citizen science web portal developed by the Community Environmental Health Lab at the MDI Biological Laboratory in Bar Harbor, Maine. Anecdata.org supports projects in the collection of observational data, primarily in environmental science, biology, and public health. Anecdata was founded in 2014 to provide a data management system for the citizen science projects run by the Community Environmental Health Lab and has since expanded to include more than 200 projects, where more than 8,000 registered users have contributed over 30,000 images and more than 50,000 observations. In addition to the desktop site, there is a corresponding mobile app that can be used to submit observations to existing projects. Anecdata.org also acts as a data repository where data can be stored, discovered, and shared to other users.

Notable Projects

Litter-Free Digital Journal
The Litter-Free Digital Journal is a project from the South Carolina Aquarium hosted on Anecdata.org with a custom app, that encourages participants to track and remove plastics and other litter from both land and water. Users  Since the start of the project in 2016, data from more than 7,000 litter clean ups have been entered into the project by more than 1,500 citizen scientists.  In 2017, a total of 9,746 pieces of trash were logged and 2,333 total litter pieces in 2018. However, in 2019 the number of litter pieces recorded grew to 32,600 and in 2020, more than doubled, with 74,977 pieces of trash collected and logged. The data from this project has inspired participant activism and has been used to influence public policy in South Carolina, including plastic bag bans.

The Great Green Crab Hunt
The Great Green Crab Hunt project is a citizen science project led by the University of New Hampshire and the New Hampshire Sea Grant and hosted on Anecdata.org. The project aims to support scientists and policymakers in finding solutions to the problems caused by the invasive species, European green crabs.  The project uses the mobile app with and participants document the number, shell hardness, sex, and size of crabs seen during a one-hour time period. Since the project's inception in 2019, more than 100 observations documenting more than 400 crabs have been added to the project.

References

Science websites
Human-based computation
Citizen science
Environmental organizations based in the United States